Tom J. Dugger (born November 10, 1948) is a Republican member of the Oklahoma State Senate, representing the 21st district. He was initially elected in November 2015. He is a certified public accountant.

References

Living people
Oklahoma Republicans
1948 births
21st-century American politicians